Zygosaccharomyces florentinus is a plant pathogen.

See also
 List of strawberry diseases

References

Fungal plant pathogens and diseases
Fungal strawberry diseases
Saccharomycetaceae
Fungi described in 1938